The Kuwait PSA Cup 2011 is the men's edition of the 2011 Kuwait PSA Cup, which is a PSA World Series event Platinum (prize money: $165,000). The event took place in Kuwait City in Kuwait from 23 to 29 November 2011. James Willstrop won his first Kuwait PSA Cup trophy, beating Karim Darwish in the final.

Prize money and ranking points
For 2011, the prize purse was $165,000. The prize money and points breakdown is as follows:

Seeds

Draw and results

Finals
 After draw

Top half

Section 1

Section 2

Section 3

Section 4

Bottom half

Section 1

Section 2

Section 3

Section 4

See also
Kuwait PSA Cup
2011 Men's World Open Squash Championship
PSA World Tour 2011
PSA World Series 2011

References

External links
Kuwait PSA Cup 2011 website
Kuwait PSA Cup 2011 official website
Kuwait PSA Cup 2011 Squash Site website

Men's Kuwait PSA Cup
Men's Kuwait PSA Cup
Squash tournaments in Kuwait